Vincenzo Meucci (1694–1766) was an Italian painter of the late-Baroque period. Born in Florence. He was a pupil first of the painter Sebastiano Galeotti, then of Giovanni Gioseffo dal Sole in Bologna.

He was patronized by the Marchese Giovan Battista Salimbeni of Siena, as well as the cardinals Alessandro Chigi Zondadari and Neri Corsini. His masterpiece was a commission by Anna Maria Luisa de' Medici, the last Medici resident of the Pitti Palace, who contracted him to fresco the cupola of the Basilica di San Lorenzo di Firenze with the Glory of Florentine Saints (1742).

Among his pupils are Tommaso Gherardini.

Selected works
Frescoes for Chapel of San Mauro, Badia Fiorentina, Florence (1717)
Madonna del Rosario, Santa Lucia alla Castellina, Sesto Fiorentino (1731)
Frescoes for ceiling at the entrance of Ospedale di San Giovanni di Dio, Florence(1735)
Frescoes for Palazzo Panciatichi, Florence (c. 1741)
Marriage of Virgin Church of San Paolino, Florence
Altarpiece for church of Santa Maria Maggiore, Florence
Ascension of Christ, frescoed on nave ceiling of San Salvatore al Vescovo, Florence

References

Drawing's from Lille. Florence, Palazzo Pitti, Review author[s]: Luisa Vertova
The Burlington Magazine (1992) p 141–2.

1694 births
1766 deaths
18th-century Italian painters
Italian male painters
Painters from Florence
Italian Baroque painters
18th-century Italian male artists